, also known as Cosmos, is a 1997 Japanese movie directed by . It is the story of a Japanese girl returning to Japan after seven years in South America where she contracted AIDS.

Notes

External links
 

1997 films
1990s Japanese-language films
HIV/AIDS in film
1990s Japanese films